Worldwide Cancer Research is Scotland’s only  cancer research charity. A small charity with a big reach, it funds discovery research (also called early-stage, basic or fundamental research) worldwide that aims to lay the groundwork for cures for cancer.

The team of 40 currently works to fund £4 million of cancer research around the world every year – raised entirely from donations. Its stated vision is to see a world where no life is cut short by cancer.

Established in 1979, Worldwide Cancer Research has awarded over £180 million in research grants in 34 different countries. It supports discovery research, by funding scientific ideas at the very start of the research journey, and by supporting scientists who ask bold, challenging questions about how cancer works.

Dr Helen Rippon is the Chief Executive of the charity, appointed in 2016. Previously the charity’s Director of Research, she has over 17 years of experience in the field of cancer research – including a PhD in Molecular Biology from the University of York – and was a Postdoctoral Research Fellow at Imperial College London.

The head office is in the West End of Edinburgh, Scotland and its charitable registration is at the Office of the Scottish Charity Regulator.

See also
 European Organisation for Research and Treatment of Cancer

References

External links
Official website

Health charities in the United Kingdom
Cancer organisations based in the United Kingdom
1979 establishments in the United Kingdom
Organizations established in 1979